East Choiseul is a single-member constituency of the National Parliament of Solomon Islands. Located on Choiseul Island, it was established in 1993 when Parliament was expanded from 38 to 47 seats; Its first MP, Allan Qurusu, had previously served as the MP for North Choiseul between 1980 and 1993, when the constituency was abolished.

List of MPs

Election results

2019

2014

2010

2006

2001

1997

1993

References

Solomon Islands parliamentary constituencies
1993 establishments in the Solomon Islands
Constituencies established in 1993